The Poor Removal Act 1795 (35 Geo 3 c 101), sometimes called the Removal Act of 1795, was an Act of Parliament which modified the Settlement Act 1662, an Act which concerned when a pauper could receive Poor relief. The effect of the Removal Act was "that no non-settled person could be removed from a parish unless he or she applied for relief."

References

Further reading
Digital Reproduction of the Original Act on the Parliamentary Archives catalogue

Poor Law in Britain and Ireland
Great Britain Acts of Parliament 1795